Helminda pilipennis is a species of beetle in the family Cerambycidae, and the only species in the genus Helminda. It was described by Blanchard in 1851.

References

Forsteriini
Beetles described in 1851